Sir John Woodburn  (13 July 1843 – 21 November 1902) was an Indian Civil Servant, who later served as Lieutenant Governor of Bengal from 1898 to 1902.

Early life and education
Woodburn was born at Barrackpore in British India to David Woodburn. After early education at Arya Academy in Bengal, he went to Scotland to study at Glasgow University and Edinburgh University.

Career
Woodburn joined the Indian Civil Service in 1863 and arrived in India. He served most of his early career on various positions in the North-Western Provinces and Oudh. After early years in Oudh, he was from 1882 secretary to the government of the North Western Provinces, and from 1888 to 1893 he was Chief Secretary of the province. During these years, he was from 1890 an additional member of the Viceroy's Executive Council. In 1893 he was appointed Chief Commissioner of the Central Provinces, serving two years until 1895.

He was in 1895 asked by the new Viceroy, Lord Elgin to become a permanent member of the Viceroy's Executive Council, with responsibility for the Home department. During his time in this office he had to deal with the severe famine of 1896–98. The famine especially affected the Central provinces ha had just left, and he worked closely with the new governor Sir Sir Charles Lyall to contain the suffering. He was appointed a Companion of the Order of the Star of India (CSI) in 1892, and was knighted as a Knight Commander (KCSI) in the order in 1897.

Lieutenant-Governor of Bengal

In April 1898, he was selected the successor of Sir Charles Stevens to the post of the Lieutenant Governor of Bengal, which position he retained till his death on 21 November 1902. During his years in Calcutta he worked to contain the plague taking hold in the city and presidency, and took an interest in local institutions in the city, which he preferred to his summer capital of Darjeeling. Woodburn worked hard for the development of jail and health administration of Bengal. He travelled extensively in the city and throughout the province. In their obituary, The London Times described his years in Bengal the following way:

He served as president of The Asiatic Society for the years 1900–01.

Woodburn died after a short illness at Calcutta on 21 November 1902, and was buried at Circular Road Cemetery of Calcutta.

He was succeeded by Sir Andrew Fraser as next Governor of Bengal.

Family
Woodburn married in 1869 Isabella Cassels Walker, daughter of Mr. John Walker, of Drumgrange, Ayrshire, and they had several daughters.

Works
Woodburn's published works include his memoirs Sir John Woodburn, K.C.S.I., Lieut.-Governor of Bengal from 1898 to 1902: a Biographical Retrospect by Sir John Woodburn (K.C.S.I.), Jessy J. Matheson. published in 1926.

Memorials
A bronze statue of him was unveiled in 1905, which earlier stood at Dalhouse Square of Kolkata - has now been shifted to Victoria Memorial.
A street in Kolkata was named after him, as Woodburn Street in Kolkata.
A park is named as Woodburn Park after him and road was earlier known as Woodburn Park Road also at Kolkata.
Woodburn Ward of SSKM Hospital, Kolkata is also named after him, where at present special patients like VVIP, VIP are treated.

References

1843 births
1902 deaths
Lieutenant-governors of Bengal
Knights Commander of the Order of the Star of India
Indian Civil Service (British India) officers
Members of the Council of the Governor General of India
Alumni of the University of Glasgow
Alumni of the University of Edinburgh
People from North 24 Parganas district
Politicians from Kolkata
Presidents of The Asiatic Society